George T. H. Reid MC (1910–1990) was a Scottish minister of the Church of Scotland who served as Moderator of the General Assembly in 1973/74.

Life

He was born on 31 March 1910 in Leith the twin son of Rev David Reid DD (1865-1933) of St John's United Free Church, and his wife Georgina Thomson Stuart (1872-1946).

The family lived at 6 Claremont Park on Leith Links. From 1925 to 1932 his father ran the Wellesley Square Church in Calcutta in India.

George was educated at George Watson's College then studied Divinity at Edinburgh University.

He was minister of the Langstane Kirk in Aberdeen.

He won the Military Cross in the Second World War.

In 1973 he succeeded Ronald Selby Wright as Moderator of the General Assembly. He was succeeded in turn by Very Rev David Steel in 1974.

He retired in 1975.

He died in 1990 and is buried with his parents and family in the Grange Cemetery in Edinburgh. The grave lies close to the south-east corner, east of the east path.

Family
He was married to Anne Guilland Watt (1915-2006)

He was twin brother to Rev Prof John ("Jack") Kelman Sutherland Reid (1910-2002).

References

1910 births
People from Leith
People educated at George Watson's College
Alumni of the University of Edinburgh
Moderators of the General Assembly of the Church of Scotland
1990 deaths
20th-century Ministers of the Church of Scotland